Maraveh Tappeh County is in Golestan province, Iran. The capital of the county is the city of Maraveh Tappeh. At the 2006 census, the region's population (as Maraveh Tappeh District of Kalaleh County) was 45,874 in 8,939 households. The following census in 2011 counted 55,821 people in 12,815 households, by which time the district had been separated from the county to form Maraveh Tappeh County. At the 2016 census, the county's population was 60,953 in 16,211 households.

Administrative divisions

The population history and structural changes of Maraveh Tappeh County's administrative divisions over three consecutive censuses are shown in the following table. The latest census shows two districts, four rural districts, and one city.

References

 

Counties of Golestan Province